Mattias Nilsson (born 19 February 1982 in Brunflo, near Östersund) is a former Swedish biathlete. 

Nilsson retired after the 2010–11 season, announcing on 27 September 2011 his retirement from the sport due to a heart condition.

In May 2018, it was announced that he, from the 2018–2019 season, becomes coach for Team Sweden in men's cross-country skiing together with Johan Olsson and Fredrik Uusitalo.

References

External links
 

1982 births
Living people
Swedish male biathletes
Biathletes at the 2006 Winter Olympics
Biathletes at the 2010 Winter Olympics
Olympic biathletes of Sweden
People from Östersund Municipality
21st-century Swedish people